Gyda Martha Kristine Christensen (née Andersen; 21 May 1872 –  20 August 1964)  was a Norwegian actress, dancer, choreographer and managing director.

Biography
Christensen was born in Kristiania (now Oslo), Norway. She was the only child of Ole Andersen and Cathrine Saabye. She received music and singing lessons during adolescence.   

She was part of the ensemble at Christiania Theatre from 1894 to 1899 and again from 1920 to 1928, and at Nationaltheatret from 1899 to 1919. She played a number of major roles, most often in the light genre. She was engaged as dance and artistic director at Det Nye Teater from 1928 to 1945. From 1936 to 1939 she was the artistic director at Nationaltheatret. In 1909 she became the managing director for the Nationaltheatret ballet school. In 1937 she directed the film To levende og en død with her son-in-law Tancred Ibsen.

Personal life
In 1893, she married engineer Georg Monrad Krohn (1865–1934).  They were the parents of dancer and actress Lillebil Ibsen (1899–1989) who was married to film director Tancred Ibsen (1893–1978).

In 1905, she married theater director Halfdan Christensen (1873–1950). In 1946, she married  political leader Carl Joachim Hambro (1885–1964).

References

1872 births
1964 deaths
Norwegian stage actresses
Norwegian female dancers
Norwegian choreographers
Ballet mistresses
19th-century Norwegian actresses
20th-century Norwegian actresses
Norwegian film directors
Norwegian women film directors